Caxias may refer to:

Places

Brazil
Caxias do Sul, Rio Grande do Sul
Caxias (Maranhão)
Duque de Caxias, Rio de Janeiro
 Caxias River, a river of Maranhão state in northeastern Brazil

Portugal
Caxias, Oeiras

Mars
Caxias (crater), a Martian impact crater

Football clubs
 Sociedade Esportiva e Recreativa Caxias do Sul, a Brazilian football (soccer) club from Caxias do Sul, Rio Grande do Sul
 Caxias Futebol Clube, a Brazilian football (soccer) club from Joinville, Santa Catarina
 Duque de Caxias Futebol Clube, a Brazilian football (soccer) club from Duque de Caxias, Rio de Janeiro
 CEPE-Caxias, a Brazilian women's football team, from Duque de Caxias, Rio de Janeiro state

See also
 Luís Alves de Lima e Silva, Duke of Caxias (1803–1880), Brazilian military leader, nobleman and statesman